Robinson's web-footed salamander (Bolitoglossa robinsoni) is a species of salamander in the family Plethodontidae.
It can be found in Costa Rica and Panama.

References
 Bolaños, F. & D. B. Wake. 2009: Two new species of montane web-footed salamanders (Plethodontidae: Bolitoglossa) from the Costa Rica-Panamá border region. Zootaxa, 1981: 57–68. Abstract

Bolitoglossa
Amphibians described in 2009